Ognjen is a Slavic given name derived from word oganj meaning "fire" and may refer to:

Ognjen Amidžić, Serbian TV host
Ognjen Aškrabić (born 1979), Serbian professional basketball player
Ognjen Cvitan (born 1961), Croatian (formerly Yugoslavian) chess grandmaster
Ognjen Filipović (born 1973), Yugoslav-born sprint canoeist
Ognjen Koroman (born 1978), Serbian footballer
Ognjen Kuzmić, Serbian professional basketball player
Ognjen Lekić (born 1982), Serbian professional football player
Ognjen Mudrinski (born 1991), Serbian footballer
Ognjen Petrović (1948–2000), Serbian goalkeeper
Ognjen Prica (1899–1941), Yugoslav left-wing politician
Ognjen Stojanović (born 1990), Serbian triathlete
Alberto Ognjen Štriga (1821–1897), Croatian reformer, composer and musician
Ognjen Sviličić (born 1971), Croatian screenwriter and film director
Ognjen Tadić (born 1974), Serb politician
Ognjen Topic (born 1986), American Muay Thai champion
Ognjen Vranješ (born 1989), Bosnian Serb professional footballer
Ognjen Vukojević (born 1983), Croatian footballer who plays as a defensive midfielder
Ognjen Jaramaz (born 1993), Serbian professional basketball player
Ognjen Đerić (born 1994),French professional handball player

See also
 Ognjenović
 Slavic names

Masculine given names
Slavic masculine given names
Croatian masculine given names
Serbian masculine given names
Slovene masculine given names